Route 249 is a , four-lane state highway in the southwestern part of the U.S. state of Missouri. It is a freeway that travels from Interstate 44/Interstate 49 (I-44/I-49) in Joplin and ending at Business I-49 (I-49 Bus.) in Carterville.

The road has been built as a freeway and could be a future part of I-49 which will travel down the U.S. Route 71 (US 71) corridor. It is also possible that it will be resigned as part of a possible I-249 in the future.

Route description
Route 249 begins at an interchange with I-44, I-49, and US 71 east of Joplin in Jasper County, where the road continues south as I-49/US 71. The route heads north as a four-lane freeway through agricultural areas with some nearby development, coming to an interchange with Route 66/I-44 Bus. west of Duenweg. The freeway continues north to the next interchange at Newman Road. Route 249 curves northwest and comes to the exit for Route VV (Zora Street). The route curves north and ends at an interchange with I-49 Bus./Route 171 near Carterville.

History
After an agreement between EPA and the state of Missouri, the Missouri Highway and Transportation Department built the Route 249 highway bypass through  of contaminated land on the site in 2001. The project adaptively reused mine wastes as fill material. Cleanup of the Superfund site began in 2007, and the Route 249 bypass opened to the public in 2008.

It is proposed that Route 249 is to be the first leg of a loop encircling the Joplin area.

Exit list

References

External links

249
249
Transportation in Jasper County, Missouri
Joplin, Missouri, metropolitan area